The Ambassador of Zimbabwe to the United Kingdom is an officer of the Zimbabwean Ministry of Foreign Affairs and the head of the Embassy of the Republic of Zimbabwe to the United Kingdom in London. The position has the rank and status of an Ambassador Extraordinary and Plenipotentiary and also serves as Zimbabwe's non-resident accredited Ambassador to Ireland.

The Ambassador is currently Colonel Christian Katsande. Having been a High Commission since Zimbabwe's formal independence in 1980, on Zimbabwe's departure from the Commonwealth of Nations in 2003, the High Commission became an Embassy. Based in Zimbabwe House on the Strand, London, the embassy dates back to the establishment of the High Commission of Southern Rhodesia in 1924 after that colony was granted a limited form of self-government in 1923. The office later became the High Commission of the Federation of Rhodesia and Nyasaland from 1954 to 1963, the Southern Rhodesia High Commission from 1963 to 1965, and the Rhodesian Representative Office from 1965 to 1969. Between 2016 and 2018 the office was vacant, as the UK Government had rejected President Robert Mugabe's nominee, Ray Ndhlukula, for his role in the Mugabe government's land seizure program.

Office-holders

High Commissioners from Southern Rhodesia, 1924–53

High Commissioners from the Federation of Rhodesia and Nyasaland, 1954–63

High Commissioners from Southern Rhodesia, 1963–1965

Representative from Rhodesia, 1965–1969

High Commissioners from Zimbabwe, 1980–2003

Ambassadors from Zimbabwe, 2003–date

See also
United Kingdom–Zimbabwe relations
List of ambassadors of the United Kingdom to Zimbabwe

References

External links
Embassy of Zimbabwe to the United Kingdom and Ireland

United Kingdom
Zimbabwe
Zimbabwe and the Commonwealth of Nations
United Kingdom and the Commonwealth of Nations